= Meyer Kaplan =

American-born Israeli forensic scientist

- מאייר קפלן
- Kaplan in 1974
- Born: 1923; New York City, New York, U.S.
- Died: 2004 (aged 80–81)
- Education: Columbia University
- Known for: Forensic science
- Spouse: Sylvia née Kolatch
- Awards: Pulitzer scholarship (1941); M.A. in philosophy (1947); Israel police medal of service

Meyer "Mike" Kaplan (Hebrew: מאייר "מייק" קפלן; 1923–2004) was an American-born Israeli forensic scientist.

== Biography ==
Kaplan was born and raised in New York City. He received a Pulitzer scholarship for his B.A. (1941) from Columbia University. In 1947 he received his M.A. in Philosophy, also from Columbia University.

Upon completing his graduate degree, Kaplan and his wife, Sylvia née Kolatch, volunteered to work for Aliyah La-No'ar in France, teaching World War II refugee children and bringing them to Marseille, where they were prepared for illegal immigration to Mandate Palestine. Kaplan and his wife moved to Israel after the declaration of the State of Israel, escorting 120 children to Haifa, Israel on the ship Pan York (renamed Kibbutz Galuyot).

After a six-month stay in Kibbutz Yavneh, Kaplan moved to Jerusalem. There he abandoned his original plan to study for a doctorate at the Hebrew University and pursue an academic career. Instead, he decided to join the forensic science unit of the nascent Israel Police.

Kaplan returned to the United States for professional training. He studied at the University of California, Los Angeles, but besides theoretical knowledge he also acquired practical experience. Following a request by the Consulate of Israel, the Los Angeles Police Department allowed Kaplan to spend several months watching investigations and training in its forensic laboratories.

In 1952 Kaplan returned to Israel and began what was to be a 35-year career in the Israel Police, first in Tel Aviv, then in Jerusalem when National Headquarters moved there in 1973. Soon he headed the Scientific Section of the forensic laboratories, then in 1965 he began a 19-year tenure as head of the Division of Criminal Identification (Hebrew, מז"פ). For ten successive years he was the Israel Police delegate to Interpol.

Two important events in which his involvement was crucial were his assistance in the identification of Adolf Eichmann before his capture and trial, In 2007, he received a certificate of appreciation from the Government of Israel for the Eichmann captors in May 1960 at the Knesset as President and Prime Minister for his activities in the capture and prosecution of the tyrant Adolf Eichmann in Israel. The second is the introduction of dogs to locate bodies of fallen soldiers after the 1973 Yom Kippur War. Of more long-range importance, Kaplan was responsible for the professionalization of the forensic laboratories, bringing in scientists with graduate degrees and promoting research, but at the same time stressing the practical goals of the police.

Kaplan supervised the establishment of a national network of evidence technicians, who collect evidence at crime scenes and forward it to the laboratories for examination. This was based on accurate and complete chain-of-evidence collection as a major key to forensic science. If evidence is not professionally collected and properly forwarded for examination, he felt that the potential of the forensic science laboratories is wasted. Therefore, he built an evidence technician network with professional responsibility to the laboratories, which teach, evaluate, and update the technicians to maximize upon evidence collection.

In 1976, he received the medal of service from the Israel police. The certificate of appreciation states: During his service in the police, Lt. Gen. Meir Kaplan developed the services for forensic identification. He designed and perfected working methods in this field and established professional contacts with science and research institutions in Israel and abroad.

In private life Kaplan was elected president of the Association of Americans and Canadians in Israel (AACI). There he advocated a then-controversial program of not only assisting North American immigration to immigrate Israel, but also promoting aliyah abroad.
